The 2022–23 season will see Glasgow Warriors compete in the competitions: the United Rugby Championship and the European Rugby Challenge Cup.

Season overview

New Head Coach Franco Smith announced a new captain for Glasgow Warriors, the Scotland international Kyle Steyn. Steyn becomes the eleventh captain of the club.

Team

Coaches

 Head coach:  Franco Smith
 Assistant coach:   Peter Murchie
 Assistant coach:   Nigel Carolan
 Scrum Coach:   Alasdair Dickinson
 Head Strength and Conditioning Coach:  Cillian Reardon 
 Senior Athletic Performance Coach: Damien O'Donoghue
 Sport Scientist: Robin Reidy
 Lead Performance Analyst: Greg Woolard
 Asst. Performance Analyst: Eilidh Wright
 Asst. Performance Analyst: Aidan FitzGerald

Staff

 Managing Director: Alastair Kellock 
 Chairman: Charles Shaw
 Advisory Group: Walter Malcolm, Douglas McCrea, Alan Lees, Paul Taylor, Frank Mitchell, Scott Mathieson
 Rugby Operations Manager: Kenny Brown 
 Assistant Operations Manager: Martin Malone 
 Kit & Equipment Manager: Dougie Mills 
 Head groundsman: Colin McKinnon 
 Team Doctor: Dr. Jonathan Hanson 
 Clinical Manager and Lead Physiotherapist: Andrew Boag 
 Senior Team Physiotherapist: Hene Branders
 Senior Team Physiotherapist: Michael Clark 
 Junior Physiotherapist: Christina Finlay 
 Communications and Marketing Manager: Cameron MacAllister 
 Marketing manager: Claire Scott 
 Event Manager: Duncan Seller 
 Content Producer: Robyn Struthers
 Administrator: Jana Tobin 
 Communications Manager: Craig Wright
 Communications Assistant: Molly Mitchell
 Commercial Manager: Jamie Robertson
 Lead Account Manager: Omar Muhyeddeen
 Partnership Account Manager: Catherine Bunch 
 Sponsorship Co-Ordinator: Megan Kennedy 
 Community Manager: Stuart Lewis
 Business Club Manager: Adam Ashe

Squad

Scottish Rugby Academy Stage 3 players

These players are given a professional contract by the Scottish Rugby Academy. Although given placements they are not contracted by Glasgow Warriors. Players graduate from the Academy when a professional club contract is offered.

These players are assigned to Glasgow Warriors for the season 2022–23.

Academy players promoted in the course of the season are listed with the main squad.

  Jamie Drummond – Hooker
  Tom Banatvala – Prop
  Callum Norrie – Prop
  Harris McLeod – Lock
  Rhys Tait – Flanker
  Archie Smeaton – No. 8
  Ben Afshar – Scrum half
  Finlay Burgess – Scrum half
  Christian Townsend – Fly-half
  Ben Salmon – Centre
  Duncan Munn – Centre
  Logan Jarvie – Wing
  Ross McKnight – Wing
  Andy Stirrat – Full Back

Back up players

Other players used by Glasgow Warriors over the course of the season. Harry Murray and Euan Cunningham were named in the original academy line up by Glasgow Warriors in their June 2022 depth chart, but left out of the SRU academy announcement in July 2022 and are instead named here.

  Harry Murray (Ayrshire Bulls) – Lock
  Cory Daniel (Old Glory DC) - Flanker
  Euan Cunningham (Stirling Wolves) – Fly half
  Owen Sheehy (Old Glory DC) - Fly half
  Eli Caven (Ayrshire Bulls) - Wing
  John Rizzo (Old Glory DC) - Full back

Player statistics

Staff movements

Coaches

Personnel in

  Franco Smith from  Italy

Personnel out

  Danny Wilson released

Medical

Personnel in

Personnel out

Staff

Personnel in

Personnel out

Player movements

Academy promotions

 Gregor Brown from Scottish Rugby Academy 
 Angus Fraser from Scottish Rugby Academy
 Alex Samuel from Scottish Rugby Academy
 Max Williamson from Scottish Rugby Academy
  Euan Ferrie from Scottish Rugby Academy

Player transfers

In

 JP du Preez from  Sale Sharks
 Sione Vailanu from  Worcester Warriors 
 Huw Jones from  Harlequins
 Sintu Manjezi from  Bulls
 Allan Dell from  London Irish
 Joel Hodgson from  Newcastle Falcons
 Lucio Sordoni from  Mont-de-Marsan
  Logan Trotter from  Stirling Wolves
  Cameron Jones from  Ayrshire Bulls
  Will Hunt from  Ayrshire Bulls
  Gregor Hiddleston from  Stirling Wolves
 Cameron Neild from  Worcester Warriors
 Jack Mann from  Heriots
 Max Williamson from  London Scottish (loan ends) 
 Jamie Drummond from  London Scottish (loan ends)
 Facundo Cordero from  Exeter Chiefs

Out

 Kiran McDonald to  Wasps 
 Hamish Bain to  Jersey Reds 
 Robbie Fergusson released
 Rob Harley to  US Carcassonne
 Tom Lambert to  Waratahs
 Ewan McQuillin released
 Grant Stewart to  Connacht
 Ratu Tagive released
 Robbie McCallum to  London Scottish 
 Joel Hodgson to  Utah Warriors
 Logan Trotter to  London Irish
 Max Williamson to  London Scottish (loan) 
 Jamie Drummond to  London Scottish (loan)
 Rufus McLean released

Competitions

Pre-season and friendlies

It was announced that the Warriors would play 2 pre-season matches in September. The first, against Worcester Warriors, would take place in the Inverness Caledonian Thistle stadium as part of the celebration of the centenary of Highland RFC. The last time the Warriors played at the Inverness ground was on 25 March 2000 when they played Edinburgh Rugby there.

Unfortunately Worcester Warriors were in financial trouble; and facing administration they pulled out of the tie. Reigning Super 6 champions Ayrshire Bulls were then named as the replacement side.

Although named in the Warriors replacements, both Will Hunt and Ben Afshar came on for Ayrshire Bulls.

The next match due on 9 September 2022 against Ulster was also cancelled, due to the death of Queen Elizabeth the previous day.

Match 1

Glasgow Warriors: 

Worcester Warriors:

Match 2

Glasgow Warriors: Nathan McBeth, Johnny Matthews, Simon Berghan, Lewis Bean, Richie Gray, Sintu Manjezi, Thomas Gordon, Sione Vailanu, George Horne, Domingo Miotti, Kyle Steyn, Tom Jordan, Stafford McDowall, Walter Fifita, Cole Forbes
Replacements: Fraser Brown, Murphy Walker, Lucio Sordoni, Alex Samuel, Euan Ferrie, JP du Preez, Ryan Wilson, Jack Dempsey, Cameron Jones, Ben Afshar, Joel Hodgson, Will Hunt, Andy Stirrat, Ross McKnight, Sebastián Cancelliere

Ayrshire Bulls: Ayrshire Bulls: Liam McNamara; J Shedden, R Beattie, A Stirrat, T Glendinning; R Simpson, J Lenac; A Nimmo, J Malcolm, M Scott, E Bloodworth, A Samuel, R Jackson, Lewis McNamara, B Macpherson (captain)
Replacements: W Farquhar, A Rogers, A McGuire, J Drummond, C Henderson, E Hamilton-Bulger, T Brown, G Wilson, F Climo, C Elliot, A Tait, E Caven.

Match 3

Glasgow Warriors: 1. Nathan McBeth, 2. Johnny Matthews, 3. Murphy Walker, 4. Lewis Bean, 5. Richie Gray, 6. Sintu Manjezi, 7. Thomas Gordon, 8. Jack Dempsey, 9. George Horne, 10. Domingo Miotti, 11. Walter Fifita, 12. Tom Jordan, 13. Stafford McDowall, 14. Kyle Steyn (C), 15. Cole Forbes
Replacements: Fraser Brown, Jamie Bhatti, Lucio Sordoni, JP du Preez, Ryan Wilson, Sione Vailanu, Euan Ferrie, Cam Jones, Duncan Weir, Sam Johnson, Ross McKnight, Sebastian Cancelliere.

Ulster: 1. Eric O’Sullivan, 2. Tom Stewart, 3. Jeff Toomaga-Allen, 4. Sam Carter 5. Cormac Izuchukwu, 6. Matty Rea, 7. Sean Reffell, 8. David McCann (Captain), 9. Nathan Doak, 10. Jake Flannery, 11. Jacob Stockdale, 12. Angus Curtis, 13. Stewart Moore, 14. Rob Baloucoune, 15. Rory Telfer
Replacements: Callum Reid, John Andrew, Declan Moore, Gareth Milasinovich, Frank Bradshaw-Ryan, Harry Sheridan, Jordi Murphy, Lorcan McLoughlin, Dave Shanahan, Michael McDonald, Ian Madigan, Rob Lyttle, Craig Gilroy, Shea O’Brien.

United Rugby Championship

The dates and times for the new season were announced on 5 August 2022.

Glasgow Warriors went into their first competitive match of the season against Benetton Treviso in Italy, having only played one pre-season game. It showed, as the Italian side ran out comfortably with a 33-11 bonus point victory. New Head Coach Franco Smith stated: "Execution under pressure is one thing we definitely need to work on going forward. I also learnt a lot about the emotional intelligence of all of the players out there – you could see how each individual handled pressure, how they converted it into positive energy and so on." The team played the next week against Cardiff Rugby, sparking into life and scoring 8 tries. Matt Fagerson said: "We wanted to go out there and show the shifts we’ve made in our game, and while we know we’re by no means the finished article just yet, we did exactly that." That raised expectations for the away match against Ospreys but the Welsh side ran out 32-17 winners. Peter Murchie said: "The final scoreline was poor. There’s no getting away from that. The tale of the game is going to revolve around the mistakes we made, and we have to get better. There’s no two ways about it."

A run against South African sides was next. The home match against last season's URC finalists Bulls saw Glasgow once again click into gear with a bonus point win. Frano Smith commented: "We worked hard all pre-season knowing that we would have to match the South African teams physically, and that was important to what we managed to achieve tonight."

League table

Results

Round 1

Round 2

Round 3

Round 4

Round 5

Round 6

Round 7

Round 8

Round 9

Round 10 – 1872 Cup 1st Leg

Round 11 - 1872 Cup 2nd Leg

Round 12

Round 13

Round 14

Round 6 rescheduled

Round 15

Round 16

Round 17

Round 18

European Challenge Cup

Glasgow Warriors were drawn against English side Bath Rugby and French side Perpignan in the European Challenge Cup.

Due to the freezing temperatures, the pitch at Scotstoun was deemed unplayable early and the home tie for Glasgow switched to Edinburgh's Murrayfield Stadium.

Pool A table

Results

Round 1

Round 2

Round 3

Round 4

Round of 16

Warrior of the month awards

End of Season awards

Competitive debuts this season

A player's nationality shown is taken from the nationality at the highest honour for the national side obtained; or if never capped internationally their place of birth. Senior caps take precedence over junior caps or place of birth; junior caps take precedence over place of birth. A player's nationality at debut may be different from the nationality shown. Combination sides like the British and Irish Lions or Pacific Islanders are not national sides, or nationalities.

Players in BOLD font have been capped by their senior international XV side as nationality shown.

Players in Italic font have capped either by their international 7s side; or by the international XV 'A' side as nationality shown.

Players in normal font have not been capped at senior level.

A position in parentheses indicates that the player debuted as a substitute. A player may have made a prior debut for Glasgow Warriors in a non-competitive match, 'A' match or 7s match; these matches are not listed.

Tournaments where competitive debut made:

Crosshatching indicates a jointly hosted match.

Sponsorship
 SP Energy Networks – Title Sponsor and Community Sponsor
 Scottish Power – Official Kit

Official kit supplier
 Macron

Official kit sponsors
 Malcolm Group
 McCrea Financial Services
 Denholm Oilfield
 Ross Hall Hospital
 Story Contracting
 Leidos

Official sponsors
 The Famous Grouse
 Clyde Travel Management
 Harper Macleod
 Caledonia Best
 Eden Mill Brewery and Distillery
 David Lloyd Leisure
 Crabbie's
 CALA Homes
 Capital Solutions
 Martha's Restaurant
 Sterling Furniture

Official partners
 A.G. Barr
 Benchmarx
 Black & Lizars
 Cameron House
 Glasgow Airport
 Healthspan Elite
 KubeNet
 Mentholatum
 MSC Nutrition
 Smile Plus
 Lenco Utilities
 Scot JCB News Scotland
 HF Group
 Primestaff
 Village Hotel Club
 The Crafty Pig
 Kooltech
 Savills
 iPro Sports
 RHA

References

2022-23
2022–23 in Scottish rugby union
2022–23 United Rugby Championship by team
2022–23 European Rugby Champions Cup by team